Son of Flubber is a 1963 American science fiction comedy fim directed by Robert Stevenson and produced by Walt Disney Productions. It is the sequel to The Absent-Minded Professor (1961) and the first sequel to a Disney film. Fred MacMurray reprises his role from the previous film as Ned Brainard, a scientist who has perfected a high-bouncing substance, Flubber ("flying rubber"), that can levitate an automobile and cause athletes to bounce into the sky. In addition to MacMurray, Nancy Olson, Keenan Wynn, Ed Wynn, Elliott Reid, and Tommy Kirk also co-star, reprising their roles from the previous film.

Released on January 16, 1963, the film was shot in black and white, but a colorized version was released on VHS in 1997.

Plot
Professor Ned Brainard's discovery of Flubber has not quite brought him or his college the riches he thought.

The Pentagon has declared his discovery "top secret" and the IRS has slapped him with a huge tax bill, even though he has yet to receive any money from his invention. Ned thinks he may have found the solution in the form of "Flubbergas", or the "son of Flubber", which can actually change the weather. His wife Betsy becomes fed up with all the stress and files for divorce; the professor's old rival, Professor Shelby, starts trying to woo her again.

Brainard's experiments with a ray projector device are making it rain inside people's houses all over town. When Brainard feels threatened by Professor Shelby's attentions towards his wife, Brainard uses it to make it rain insides Shelby's car, complete with thunder and lightning, to frighten the man, causing his car to crash right into the same police car that he wrecked in the Absent-Minded Professor.

The Flubbergas also helps Medfield College's football team win an important game, but it has one unfortunate side effect: Flubbergas only works on makeshift clouds, but when it comes to real clouds, there is no rain at all, instead, it shatters the glass all over town. This places Brainard on the lam from Alonzo P. Hawk, who is planning to close Medfield College, and whose insurance company must pay the claims for the broken glass. Mr. Hawk traces the damage to Ned, and threatens legal action after Ned rejects his offer to become partners in a glass company scam.

At home, Ned's wife Betsy is jealous of the attentions lavished on him by an old high school girlfriend Shelby brings around to help him win Betsy's affections. She dumps Shelby after Ned is arrested.

On trial, Ned's future seems hopeless as he is faced with the various property damage lawsuit. A prosecutor urges Ned to return to his classroom and give up his science experiments. However, the county agricultural extension agent shows the court that crops all around the town have experienced accelerated growth because of Ned's experiments, because of what the agent names "Dry Rain".

The professor is acquitted and he and Betsy are reunited.

Driving home in their flying car, Betsy tells Ned she is now crazy about his science experiments, and soon they share a kiss. In the last scene, the football filled with Flubbergas flies into outer space.

Cast

Production notes
This is a film in which Ed Wynn and his son Keenan Wynn appear together. They also each appeared in The Absent Minded Professor.

Plans to make a sequel to The Absent-Minded Professor were announced in November 1961. According to Walt Disney's daughter, her father (who abhorred sequels) made the film only because there were unused gags from The Absent-Minded Professor.

The scene, where the Professor makes it rain into Shelby's car, causing the accident with a police car, is very similar to the scene in The Absent-Minded Professor, where the Professor repeatedly jumps on top of Shelby's car, honking his Model T horn, causing an accident with the same police car.

The football game was filmed on a field constructed in a studio, with players suspended by wires.

Medfield College, which was also the setting for the earlier film The Absent-Minded Professor, was later used for Disney's Dexter Riley trilogy: The Computer Wore Tennis Shoes (1969), Now You See Him, Now You Don't (1972), and The Strongest Man in the World (1975), with all three starring Kurt Russell and Cesar Romero.

Reception
Son of Flubber was a critical and commercial success. It grossed $22,129,412 at the box office, earning $7.1 million in theatrical rentals, making it the 6th highest-grossing film of 1963. The film holds an 86% "Fresh" rating on the review aggregate website Rotten Tomatoes. It was not as well received critically as the original.

Bosley Crowther of The New York Times wrote: "It is crazy, of course, in the spirit of old-fashioned sight-gag slapstick farce, but it is fun—and, indeed, a bit of a satire on the weird inventions of the new atomic age". Variety opined that the film "doesn't fill its father's footprints" and "lacks the ingenuity, clarity and neatness of its memorable progenitor. Fortunately, though, individual scenes within the less effective whole have the same uproarious, bellylaugh quality that characterized the original". Philip K. Scheuer of the Los Angeles Times wrote: "Since I had no laugh-o-meter handy I was unable to clock the yocks but I am sure 'Son of Flubber' will hold its own against The Absent-Minded Professor and Bon Voyage". The Monthly Film Bulletin thought that the film "strains too hard to repeat the success of its predecessor, The Absent-Minded Professor, and is further weighed down by some unnecessary complications presented with little wit or sparkle. But the slapstick is generally as inventive as before, taking in a delightful spoof commercial for flubber and some excellent special effects when Professor Brainard launches his home-made clouds and his flubberised football player".

See also
 List of American films of 1963

References

External links
 
 
 
 

1963 films
1960s children's comedy films
1960s science fiction comedy films
Walt Disney Pictures films
American black-and-white films
American children's comedy films
American science fiction comedy films
American sequel films
1960s English-language films
Films directed by Robert Stevenson
Films produced by Walt Disney
Films produced by Bill Walsh (producer)
Medfield College films
Films scored by George Bruns
1963 comedy films
The Absent-Minded Professor
1960s American films